Ade Resky Dwicahyo (born 13 May 1998) is an Indonesian-born Azerbaijani badminton player. Playing in men's singles and men's doubles, he became an Azerbaijani naturalized citizen in 2018. He represented Azerbaijan at the 2020 Summer Olympics.

Achievements

BWF International Challenge/Series (14 titles, 8 runners-up) 
Men's singles

Men's doubles

  BWF International Challenge tournament
  BWF International Series tournament
  BWF Future Series tournament

Performance timeline 
Performance timeline

National team 
 Senior level

Individual competitions

Junior level
 Boys' singles

Senior level

Men's singles

Men's doubles

References

External links 
 

1998 births
Living people
Indonesian male badminton players
Indonesian emigrants to Azerbaijan
Naturalized citizens of Azerbaijan
Azerbaijani male badminton players
Badminton players at the 2020 Summer Olympics
Olympic badminton players of Azerbaijan